Rincón de Luz is a 2003 Argentinian telenovela for children and teenagers.

Rincón de Luz may also refer to:
 Chiquititas: Rincón de Luz, a 2001 Argentine film.
 Rincón de Luz (orphanage), the fictional orphanage from Chiquititas

See also
Chiquititas, an Argentine children's musical telenovela
El rincón de los prodigios, 1987 Mexican telenovela